Ain't Misbehavin' is a British sitcom that aired on BBC1 from 20 March 1994 to 14 February 1995. It stars Peter Davison and Nicola Pagett and was written by Roy Clarke, the writer of Last of the Summer Wine and Keeping Up Appearances.

Cast
Peter Davison – Clive Quigley
Nicola Pagett – Sonia Drysdale
Lesley Manville – Melissa Quigley (series 1)
Karen Drury – Melissa Quigley (series 2)
John Duttine – Dave Drysdale
Polly Hemingway – Ramona Whales
Barry Stanton – Lester Whales (series 2)
Ian McNeice – Chuck Purvis (series 1)
Paul Brooke – Chuck Purvis (series 2)

Plot
Clive Quigley starts the series thinking he is happily married to his wife Melissa, but Sonia Drysdale comes along and informs him that her husband Dave is having an affair with Melissa. Clive believes her only after spying on Melissa and Dave together, and even contemplates suicide. He and Sonia then join forces to split up the affair, but they do not know that Melissa and Dave haven't actually committed adultery yet. Sonia and Clive hire a private detective called Chuck Purvis. The other characters were Lester and Ramona Whales. Ramona was Clive's secretary, whom her jealous husband Lester always thought was having an affair with Clive.

Episodes

Series One (1994)
Episode One (20 March 1994)
Episode Two (27 March 1994)
Episode Three (3 April 1994)
Episode Four (10 April 1994)
Episode Five (17 April 1994)
Episode Six (24 April 1994)

Series Two (1995)
Episode One (10 January 1995)
Episode Two (17 January 1995)
Episode Three (24 January 1995)
Episode Four (31 January 1995)
Episode Five (7 February 1995)
Episode Six (14 February 1995)

References
Mark Lewisohn, "Radio Times Guide to TV Comedy", BBC Worldwide Ltd, 2003
British TV Comedy Guide for Ain't Misbehavin'

External links

1994 British television series debuts
1995 British television series endings
1990s British sitcoms
BBC television sitcoms
English-language television shows
Television shows set in Yorkshire